Ural is a rural locality (a village) in Zilairsky Selsoviet, Baymaksky District, Bashkortostan, Russia. The population was 215 as of 2010. There are 5 streets.

Geography 
Ural is located 77 km southeast of Baymak (the district's administrative centre) by road. Verkhnyaya Kardailovka is the nearest rural locality.

References 

Rural localities in Baymaksky District